Nina Balaban (born 2 November 1995) is a Macedonian sports shooter. She competed in the women's 10 metre air rifle event at the 2016 Summer Olympics.

References

External links
 

1995 births
Living people
Sportspeople from Ohrid
Macedonian female sport shooters
Olympic shooters of North Macedonia
Shooters at the 2016 Summer Olympics
Shooters at the 2015 European Games
European Games competitors for North Macedonia